H. americanus may refer to:
 Habronattus americanus, a spider species
 Halictophagus americanus, a strepsipteran species
 Heliocarpus americanus, a tree species
 Hemitripterus americanus, a fish species
 Homarus americanus, a lobster species
 Humulus americanus, a flowering plant species

See also
 Americanus (disambiguation)